International Day of the Girl Child is an international observance day declared by the United Nations; it is also called the Day of Girls and the International Day of the Girl. October 11, 2012, was the first Day of the Girl Child. The observation supports more opportunity for girls and increases awareness of gender inequality faced by girls worldwide based upon their gender. This inequality includes areas such as access to education, nutrition, legal rights, medical care, and protection from discrimination, violence against women and forced child marriage. The celebration of the day also "reflects the successful emergence of girls and young women as a distinct cohort in development policy, programming, campaigning and research."

Background
International Day of the Girl increases awareness of issues faced by girls around the world. Many global development plans do not include or consider girls, and their issues become "invisible".  More than 62 million girls around the world had no access to education, as of c. 2014, according to USAID.  Worldwide and collectively, girls ages 5 to 14 spend more than 160 million hours more on household chores than boys of the same age do. Globally, one in four girls are married before age 18. On October 11, 2016, Emma Watson, a United Nations Women's Goodwill Ambassador, urged countries and families worldwide to end forced child marriage. Many girls around the world are vulnerable to acts of sexual violence and the perpetrators often go unpunished.

The Day of Girls helps raise awareness not only of the issues that girls face, but also of what is likely to happen when those problems are solved. For example, educating girls helps reduce the rate of child marriage, disease and helps strengthen the economy by helping girls have access to higher paying jobs.

History 

The International Day of Girls initiative began as a project of Plan International, a non-governmental organization that operates worldwide. The idea for an international day of observance and celebration grew out of Plan International's Because I Am a Girl campaign, which raises awareness of the importance of nurturing girls globally and in developing countries in particular. Plan International representatives in Canada approached the Canadian federal government to seek to the coalition of supporters raised awareness of the initiative internationally. Eventually, Plan International urged the United Nations to become involved.

International Day of Girls was formally proposed as a resolution by Canada in the United Nations General Assembly. Rona Ambrose, Canada's Minister for the Status of Women, sponsored the resolution; a delegation of women and girls made presentations in support of the initiative at the 55th United Nations Commission on the Status of Women. On December 19, 2011, the United Nations General Assembly voted to pass a resolution adopting October 11, 2012 as the inaugural International Day of Girls. The resolution states that the Day of Girls recognizes: 

Each year's Day of Girls has a theme; the first was "ending child marriage", the second, in 2013, was "innovating for girls' education", the third, in 2014, was "Empowering Adolescent Girls: Ending the Cycle of Violence",  and the fourth, in 2015, was "The Power of Adolescent Girl: Vision for 2030". The 2016 theme was "Girls' Progress = Goals' Progress: What Counts for Girls", the 2017 theme was "EmPOWER Girls: Before, during and after crises", and the theme for 2018 was "With Her: A Skilled Girl Force".

By 2013, worldwide, there were around 2,043 events for Day of Girls.

Events worldwide

Various events to promote the Day of Girls are planned in several countries. Some are sponsored by the United Nations, such as a concert in Mumbai, India. Non-governmental organizations, such as Girl Guides Australia, also support events and activities for International Day of Girls. Local organizations have developed their own events, such as Girls and Football South Africa, who, in 2012, distributed T-shirts on International Day of Girls to commemorate the 1956 Black Sash march by 20,000 women. An all-day event was held on London's South Bank in 2013, which included theatre and film performances produced by Body Gossip, an organisation that campaigns on body image and mental health issues. For the first Day of Girls, a virtual event was developed by Sage Girl and iTwixie to bring thousands of individuals and organizations together online.

In 2016, London held a Women of the World (WOW) festival where 250 London school-aged girls were paired with women mentors. Also in 2016, the President of the United States, Barack Obama, issued a proclamation supporting an end to gender disparity.

Social media uses the hashtag #dayofthegirl to track events and news about the day.

See also
Child marriage
Girl
Gender equality
Hinamatsuri
International Day of Women and Girls in Science
International Women's Day
International development
International girl child day:अंतर्राष्ट्रीय बालिका दिवस।

References
International girl child day:अंतर्राष्ट्रीय बालिका दिवस।International girl child day:अंतर्राष्ट्रीय बालिका दिवस।

Bibliography

External links

Care International Day of Girls 2020 information
Plan International Day of Girls information
Day of Girls Day of Girls Australia website

Feminist events
Gender equality
International development
Millennium Development Goals
October observances
United Nations days
Women and education